Mandeep Antil (born 10 November 1989) is an Indian field hockey player who plays as a forward. He was the captain of the national team that won the silver medal at the 2016 South Asian Games.

References

External links
Player profile at Hockey India

1989 births
Living people
People from Sonipat district
Indian male field hockey players
Field hockey players from Haryana
South Asian Games silver medalists for India
South Asian Games medalists in field hockey